"No One in the World" is a song by American R&B singer Anita Baker. It was the fourth single from her multi-platinum album, Rapture. It had previously been released by Dionne Warwick on her 1985 album Finder of Lost Loves and again on her 1987 album Reservations for Two.

Chart performance
"No One in the World" peaked at number five on the Billboard Hot Black Singles chart, and #9 on the Billboard Adult Contemporary Singles. The single peaked at number #44, missing Billboard's top 40 Hot 100 chart.

In popular culture
The song was featured in an early 1988 episode of the US daytime soap opera All My Children as well as 1988 episodes of Santa Barbara and The Young and The Restless and a 1989 episode of Another World.

Personnel 
Drums, Percussion: John Robinson
Bass: Neil Stubenhaus
Guitars: Paul Jackson Jr., Dean Parks
Synthesizers, Keyboards, Piano: Paul Chiten, Greg Phillinganes
Arrangements by Sir Gant

Charts

Weekly charts

Year-end charts

References

External links
 [ AMG Allmusic]
 www.AnitaBaker.com

1987 singles
Anita Baker songs
Songs written by Ken Hirsch
1986 songs
Elektra Records singles
Dionne Warwick songs
1980s ballads
Contemporary R&B ballads
Soul ballads